Two ships of the Royal Navy have been named HMS Pansy :

  an  sloop launched in 1916 and sold in 1920
 , a  renamed Heartsease before completion. Transferred in 1942 to USN as USS Courage. Returned to RN in 1945 and sold in 1946. Lost in 1958.

Royal Navy ship names